George Nicol (14 December 1903 – 18 December 1968), also known as Geordie Nicol, was a Scottish professional footballer who scored 63 goals from 103 appearances in the English Football League playing for Manchester United, Brighton & Hove Albion and Gillingham. He played as a centre forward.

Nicol was born in Saltcoats, Scotland, and played in Scottish Junior football before joining Manchester United in January 1928. He moved on to Brighton in May 1929, and was their leading scorer in the 1930–31 season with 31 goals in all competitions. He had a season in the Irish League with Glenavon before returning to England to play for Gillingham and then for French club RC Roubaix. He died in Ardrossan at the age of 65.

References

1903 births
1968 deaths
People from Saltcoats
Scottish footballers
Association football forwards
Manchester United F.C. players
Brighton & Hove Albion F.C. players
Glenavon F.C. players
Gillingham F.C. players
Scottish Junior Football Association players
English Football League players
NIFL Premiership players
Kilwinning Rangers F.C. players
RC Roubaix players
Ligue 1 players
Ligue 2 players
Ardrossan Winton Rovers F.C. players
Scottish expatriate footballers
Expatriate footballers in France
Scottish expatriate sportspeople in France
Saltcoats Victoria F.C. players
Footballers from North Ayrshire